Thomas Willcocks (1877 - 1958) was a rugby union international who represented England from 1902 to 1902.

Early life
Thomas Willcocks was born in 1877 in Buckfastleigh.

Rugby union career
Willcocks made his international debut and only appearance for England on 11 January 1902 at the Rectory Field, Blackheath where England lost to Wales.

References

1877 births
1958 deaths
English rugby union players
England international rugby union players
Rugby union forwards
Rugby union players from Devon